Legacy of Dissolution is a tribute album featuring remixes of tracks by Earth.

Track listing

Earth (American band) albums
2005 remix albums
Southern Lord Records remix albums